The 1977 Wayne State Tartars football team represented Wayne State University as a member of the Great Lakes Intercollegiate Athletic Conference (GLIAC) during the 1977 NCAA Division II football season. In their fourth year under head coach Dick Lowry, the Tartars compiled a 7–4 record (3–2 against GLIAC opponents) and finished in second place in the conference.

Schedule

References

Wayne State
Wayne State Warriors football seasons
Wayne State Tartars football